Marindia is a resort of the Costa de Oro in the Canelones Department of southern Uruguay.

Geography

Location
The resort is located on the Ruta Interbalnearia between the resorts Salinas to its west and Fortín de Santa Rosa to its east.

Population
In 2011 Marindia had a population of 3,543.
 
Source: Instituto Nacional de Estadística de Uruguay

References

External links
INE map of Salinas, Pinemar-Pinepark, Marindia, Neptunia and Villa Juana

Populated places in the Canelones Department
Seaside resorts in Uruguay